"Alabama" is a musical composition by the American jazz artist John Coltrane, first recorded in 1963 by Coltrane with McCoy Tyner, Jimmy Garrison, and Elvin Jones. Two takes from that session appear on Coltrane's 1964 album Live at Birdland. It is widely believed that Coltrane conceived of and performed the composition in response to the 16th Street Baptist Church bombing on September 15, 1963—an attack by the Ku Klux Klan in Birmingham, Alabama, that killed four African-American girls: Addie Mae Collins (14), Cynthia Wesley (14), Carole Robertson (14), and Carol Denise McNair (11).

History 
Jazz historian Bill Cole, in his 1977 book, John Coltrane, states that Coltrane composed "Alabama" as a memorial to the four victims. The date of the first recording – November 18, 1963 – was  days after the bombing and  days before the assassination of John F. Kennedy. Cole asserts that the melodic line "was developed from the rhythmic inflections of a speech given by Dr. Martin Luther King."

Coltrane, Tyner, Garrison, and Jones, again, recorded "Alabama" – along with "Afro Blue" and "Impressions" – for a 30-minute TV episode of Jazz Casual, hosted by Ralph J. Gleason. The group recorded it December 7, 1963, at KQED TV in San Francisco. The episode was broadcast February 19, 1964, on WNET TV in New York, and February 23, 1964, on KQED TV in San Francisco. The quartet had been performing a twelve-day gig at the Jazz Workshop in San Francisco, nightly, from November 26, 1963, through December 8, 1963.

Recording by legacies of the original artists 
"Alabama" was one of the tracks on Jack DeJohnette's 2016 album, In Movement (recorded October 2015 at Avatar Studios in the Hell's Kitchen neighborhood of Midtown Manhattan). The other two musicians on the album, Ravi Coltrane (saxophone) and Matthew Garrison (bass), are the sons of the musicians on the original 1963 recording. In Movement was released June 5, 2016, in two formats – as a CD and as 2 LPs (ECM 2488). Music journalist Richard Williams pointed out that the personal connection to "Alabama" extended to DeJohnette, who not only had performed with John Coltrane, but had known Ravi and Matt since they were children. The trio – Jack, Ravi and Matt – also performed "Alabama" on the fifth day of the Berlin Jazz Festival, November 5, 2016, on a rainy Saturday night – four days before the world learned that Donald Trump had been elected president of the United States.

Selected sessionography

Videography and filmography 

 
 John Coltrane (tenor saxophone); McCoy Tyner (piano); Jimmy Garrison (bass); Elvin Jones (drums)
 
 (video via YouTube)

 
 The film score used the fifth take from the November 18, 1963, session: matrix 
<li> Quest 
<li> Qwest Records  (CD)
<li> Qwest Records  (cassette)
<li> Reprise Records  (CD)
<li> Qwest Records  (LP)
<li> Qwest Records  (CD)
<li> Reprise Records  (CD)
<li> BMG Direct Marketing, Inc.

See also
 Civil rights movement in popular culture

Bibliography

Original copyright

 

<li>

Annotations

Notes

References 

 

  (publication);  (article).

 .

 
 .

 

 

Compositions by John Coltrane
1963 compositions
Civil rights movement in popular culture
History of African-American civil rights
Songs based on actual events
Songs against racism and xenophobia
Protest songs
Songs about the American South
Impulse! Records singles